Purley is an unincorporated community in Franklin County, Texas, United States. According to the Handbook of Texas, the community had a population of 81 in 2000.

History
Purley was first settled in the 1850s. A post office opened in Purley in 1879 and had several stores, four sawmills and gristmills, and 150 residents. A mattress manufacturer was in the community in 1896. The community diminished in the 1900s, falling to a population of twenty with no businesses by 1966. The population of Purley grew to 81 by 1972, where it remained through 2000; a business opened in the community in 1988.

Geography

Education
Purley had a school with one teacher and 66 students in 1896. Today, the community is served by the Mount Vernon Independent School District.

References

Unincorporated communities in Franklin County, Texas
Unincorporated communities in Texas